The Mass Rapid Transit system, locally known by the initialism MRT, is a rapid transit system in Singapore and the island country's principal mode of railway transportation. The system commenced operations in November 1987 after two decades of planning with an initial  stretch consisting of five stations. The network has since grown to span the length and breadth of the country's main island – with the exception of the forested core and the rural northwestern region – in accordance with Singapore's aim of developing a comprehensive rail network as the backbone of the country's public transportation system, averaging a daily ridership of 3.4 million in 2019.

The MRT network encompasses  of grade-separated route on standard gauge. There are 134 operational stations (30 of which are interchange stations) dispersed across six lines arrayed in a circle-radial topology. The island-wide heavy rail network interchanges with a series of automated guideway transit networks localised to select suburban towns—collectively known as the Light Rail Transit (LRT) system—that complement the mainline by providing a last mile link between MRT stations and HDB public housing estates.

The MRT is the oldest, busiest, and most comprehensive metro system in Southeast Asia. Capital expenditure on its rail infrastructure reached a cumulative S$150 billion in 2021, making the network one of the world's costliest on both a per-kilometre and absolute basis. The system is managed in conformity with a semi-nationalised hybrid regulatory framework; construction and procurement fall under the purview of the Land Transport Authority (LTA), a statutory board of the government that allocates operating concessions to the for-profit private corporations SMRT and SBS Transit. These operators are responsible for asset maintenance on their respective lines, and also run bus services, facilitating operational synchronicity and the horizontal integration of the broader public transportation network.

The MRT is fully automated and is the most extensive driverless rapid transit system in the world. Asset renewal works are periodically carried out to modernise the network and ensure its continued reliability; all stations feature platform screen doors, Wi-Fi connectivity, lifts, climate control, and accessibility provisions, among others. Much of the early network is elevated above ground on concrete viaducts, with a small portion running at-grade; newer lines are largely subterranean, incorporating several of the lengthiest continuous subway tunnel sections in the world. A number of underground stations double as purpose-built air raid shelters under the operational authority of the Singapore Civil Defence Force (SCDF); these stations incorporate deep-level station boxes cast with hardened concrete and blast doors fashioned out of reinforced steel to withstand conventional aerial and chemical ordnance.

History

Planning and inception
The origins of the Mass Rapid Transit (MRT) were derived from a forecast by the country's planners back in 1967 which stated the need for a rail-based urban transport system by 1992. However, opposition from the government on the feasibility of the MRT from prominent ministers, among them Finance Minister Goh Keng Swee and Trades and Industry Minister Tony Tan, nearly shuttered the program due to financial grounds and concerns of jobs saturation in the construction industry. Dr Goh instead endorsed the idea of an all-bus system recommended by Harvard University specialists, who argued would reduce the cost by 50% compared to the proposed MRT system. Public opinion was split on the matter, with several expressing concerns on the high cost and others being more focused on increasing the standard of living. Following a debate on whether a bus-only system would be more cost-effective, Communications Minister Ong Teng Cheong came to the conclusion that an all-bus system would be inadequate, as it would have to compete for road space in a land-scarce country. Ong was an architect and town planner by training and through his perseverance and dedication became the main figure behind the initial construction of the system.

Construction begins
Singapore's MRT infrastructure is built, operated, and managed in accordance with a hybridised quasi-nationalised regulatory framework called the New Rail Financing Framework (NRFF), in which the lines are constructed and the assets owned by the Land Transport Authority, a statutory board of the Government of Singapore.
The network was planned to be constructed and opened in stages, even as plans had already indicated the decision for two main arterial lines. The North–South Line was given priority because it passed through the Central Area that has a high demand for public transport. The Mass Rapid Transit Corporation (MRTC)—later renamed SMRT Corporation—was established on 14 October 1983 and took over the roles and responsibilities of the former provisional Mass Rapid Transit Authority. On 7 November 1987, the first section of the North–South Line started operations, consisting of five stations over six kilometres. Within a year, 20 more stations had been added to the network and a direct service existed between Yishun and Lakeside stations, linking up Central Singapore to Jurong in the west by the end of 1988. The direct service was eventually split into the North–South and East–West lines after the latter's completion of the eastern sector to Tanah Merah station. By the end of 1990, the Branch line has further linked Choa Chu Kang to the network while the inauguration of Boon Lay station on 6 July 1990 marked the completion of the initial system two years ahead of schedule.

Subsequent expansions

The MRT has been continuously expanded ever since. On 10 February 1996, a S$1.2 billion expansion of the North–South Line into Woodlands was completed, merging the Branch Line into the North–South Line and joining Yishun and Choa Chu Kang stations. The concept of having rail lines that bring people almost directly to their homes led to the introduction of the Light Rail Transit (LRT) lines connecting with the MRT network. On 6 November 1999, the first LRT trains on the Bukit Panjang LRT went into operation. The Expo and Changi Airport stations were opened on 10 January 2001 and 8 February 2002 respectively. The very first infill station of the MRT network to be built on an existing line, Dover station opened on 18 October 2001.
The North East Line, the first line operated by SBS Transit, opened on 20 June 2003, is one of the first fully automated heavy rail lines in the world. On 15 January 2006, after intense two-and-a-half years lobbying by the public, Buangkok station was opened, followed by Woodleigh station much later on 20 June 2011. The Boon Lay Extension of the East–West Line, consisting of Pioneer and Joo Koon stations, opened on 28 February 2009.

The Circle Line opened in four stages with Stage 3 on 28 May 2009, Stages 1 and 2 on 17 April 2010, Stages 4 and 5 on 8 October 2011 and the Marina Bay Extension on 14 January 2012. Stage 1 of Downtown line opened on 22 December 2013 with its official opening made on 21 December 2013 by Prime Minister Lee Hsien Loong. Stage 2 opened on 27 December 2015, after being officially opened on 26 December by Prime Minister Lee. The Tuas West Extension of the East–West Line, consisting of Gul Circle, Tuas Crescent, Tuas West Road, and Tuas Link stations, opened on 18 June 2017. Stage 3, the final stage of the Downtown Line, opened on 21 October 2017 with its official opening made on 20 October 2017 by Coordinating Minister for Infrastructure and Minister for Transport Khaw Boon Wan. The second infill station, Canberra station opened on 2 November 2019. Stage 1 of the Thomson–East Coast Line opened on 31 January 2020. Stage 2 of the Thomson–East Coast Line opened on 28 August 2021, extending the line from Woodlands South to Caldecott. Stage 3 of the Thomson–East Coast Line opened on 13 November 2022, extending the line from Caldecott to Gardens by the Bay.

Network and infrastructure

Line names
The lines are named based on its directions and location. The names were envisioned to be user-friendly, as shown in a survey in which 70% of the respondents expressed such a preference. The Land Transport Authority (LTA) in July 2000 has considered other naming methods, whether by name, color or numbers. After the survey, however, the naming scheme was retained and used for subsequent future MRT lines.

Facilities and services

Except for the partly at-grade Bishan MRT station (North–South Line), the entirety of the MRT is either elevated or underground. Most below-ground stations are deep and hardened enough to withstand conventional aerial bomb attacks and to serve as bomb shelters. Mobile phone, 3G and 4G services are available in every part of the network. Underground stations and trains are air-conditioned, while above-ground stations have ceiling fans installed.

Every station is equipped with General Ticketing Machines (GTMs), a Passenger Service Centre and LED or plasma displays that show train service information and announcements. All stations are equipped with restrooms and payphones; some restrooms are located at street level. Some stations, especially the major ones, have additional amenities and services, such as retail shops and kiosks, supermarkets, convenience stores, automatic teller machines, and self-service automated kiosks for a variety of services. Most heavy-duty escalators at stations carry passengers up or down at a rate of 0.75 m/s, which is 50% faster than conventional escalators. The Land Transport Authority (LTA) announced a plan to introduce dual speeds to escalators along the North–South and East–West lines, to make it safer for senior citizens using them. As a result, all escalators on the two lines, through a refurbishment programme, will be able to operate at a different speed of 0.5 m/s during off-peak hours, with completion being targeted for 2022.

All stations constructed before 2001 initially lacked barrier-free facilities and wider AFC faregates such as lifts, ramps and tactile guidance systems for the elderly and disabled. A retrofitting programme was completed in 2006, with every station provided with at least one barrier-free access route. Over the years, additional barrier-free facilities have been constructed in stations. Since 2020, newer MRT stations have been fitted with a minimum of two lifts.

Safety

Operators and authorities have stated that numerous measures had been taken to ensure the safety of passengers, and SBS Transit publicised the safety precautions on the driverless North East line before and after its opening. Safety campaign posters are highly visible in trains and stations, and the operators frequently broadcast safety announcements to passengers and to commuters waiting for trains. Fire safety standards are consistent and equivalent with the guidelines of the National Fire Protection Association in the United States.

Full-height platform screen doors were already installed in underground stations since 1987, supplied by Westinghouse. There were calls for platform screen doors to be installed at elevated stations after several incidents in which passengers were killed by oncoming trains when they fell onto the railway tracks at elevated stations. The authorities initially rejected such calls by casting doubts over functionality and concerns about the high installation costs. Nevertheless, the LTA reversed its decision and made plans to install half-height platform screen doors in all elevated stations on 25 January 2008. The first platform screen doors by ST Electronics were installed at Jurong East, Pasir Ris, and Yishun stations in 2009 under trials to test their feasibility.

By 14 March 2012, all elevated stations have been retrofitted with the doors and are operational. These doors prevent suicides and unauthorised access to restricted areas. Under the Rapid Transit Systems Act, acts such as smoking, eating or drinking in stations and trains, the misuse of emergency equipment and trespassing on the railway tracks are illegal, with penalties ranging from fines to imprisonment.

There were a few major incidents in the history of the MRT, which opened in 1987. On 5 August 1993, two trains collided at Clementi station because of an oil spillage on the track, which resulted in 132 injuries. During the construction of the Circle Line on 20 April 2004, a tunnel being constructed under Nicoll Highway collapsed and led to the deaths of four workers. On 15 November 2017, two trains, one being empty, collided at low speed at Joo Koon station due to a malfunction with the communications-based train control (CBTC).

Prior to the 2020 circuit breaker measures during the early stages of the COVID-19 pandemic, the public transport operators and LTA were criticised by some commuters for its delayed actions of crowd control and the enforcement of social distancing on public transport. In response, the LTA rolled out a series of precautionary measures, such as social distancing measures and making the wearing of masks in public transport mandatory. Social distancing markers were progressively implemented in the MRT trains and stations which commuters must adhere to; enforced by auxiliary officers and transport ambassadors. The significant reduction of commuters as remote work increased resulted in the transport operators reducing train frequencies and closing stations earlier from 17 April. However, train frequencies were shortly reverted to normal upon review and feedback from the public.

Since June 2020, the MRT system has resumed pre-circuit breaker operations. Regulations for social distancing on public transport are no longer applicable by law. Social distancing stickers on seats were removed. However, commuters are encouraged to social distance wherever possible. Mask wearing continues to be mandatory on public transport and all other public places in Singapore. This is because all employees are being required to report back to work as soon as possible and all students resume physical schooling. Cleaning efforts on the trains and MRT stations have since been stepped up, with hand sanitizers provided at the stations.

Hours of operation
MRT lines operate from 5:30am to 1:00am daily, with the exception of selected periods, such as New Year's Eve, Chinese New Year, Deepavali, Hari Raya, Christmas, eves of public holidays and special occasions such as the state funeral of Lee Kuan Yew (2015), when most of the lines stay open throughout the night or extended till later (before the COVID-19 pandemic began in 2020). Additionally, some stretches of the line ends earlier, opens later and closes on a few days of the weekend. The nightly closures are used for maintenance. During the COVID-19 pandemic across the country, train services ended earlier and service extensions on the eves of public holidays ceased from 7 April 2020. However, from 1 June, train services were reverted to the usual hours from 5.30am to 12am (except for CNY Eve, where it will end at 30 minutes earlier from then on), and train services are no longer extended on all eves of public holidays.

Architecture and art

Early stages of the MRT's construction paid scant attention to station design, with an emphasis on functionality over aesthetics. This is particularly evident in the first few stages of the North–South and East–West lines that opened between 1987 and 1988 from Yio Chu Kang to Clementi. An exception to this was Orchard, chosen by its designers to be a "showpiece" of the system and built initially with a domed roof. Architectural themes became more important only in subsequent stages, and resulted in such designs as the cylindrical station shapes on all stations between Kallang and Pasir Ris except Eunos, and west of Boon Lay, and the perched roofs at Boon Lay, Lakeside, Chinese Garden, Bukit Batok, Bukit Gombak, Choa Chu Kang, Khatib, Yishun, and Eunos stations.

Expo station, located on the Changi Airport branch of the East–West Line, is adjacent to the 100,000-square-metre Singapore Expo exhibition facility. Designed by Foster and Partners and completed in January 2001, the station features a large, pillarless, titanium-clad roof in an elliptical shape that sheathes the length of the station platform. This complements a smaller 40-metre reflective stainless-steel disc overlapping the titanium ellipse and visually floats over a glass elevator shaft and the main entrance. The other station with similar architecture is Dover.

Changi Airport station, the easternmost station on the MRT network, has the widest platform in any underground MRT station in Singapore. In 2011, it was rated 10 out of 15 most beautiful subway stops in the world by BootsnAll. Various features have been incorporated into the design to make the station aesthetically pleasing to travellers. The station is designed by architectural firm Skidmore, Owings and Merrill, featuring a large interior space and an illuminated  link bridge spanning over the island platform.

Two Circle Line stations—Bras Basah and Stadium—were commissioned through the Marina Line Architectural Design Competition, which was jointly organised by the Land Transport Authority and the Singapore Institute of Architects. The competition did not require any prior architectural experience from competitors and is acknowledged by the industry as one of the most impartial competitions held in Singapore to date. The winner of both stations was WOHA. In 2009, "Best Transport Building" was awarded to the designers at WOHA Architects at the World Architecture Festival for their design of Bras Basah station.

Many MRT stations have specially commissioned artworks in a wide variety of art styles and mediums, including sculptures, murals and mosaics. With over 300 art pieces across 80 stations, it is Singapore's largest public art programme.

In the early stages of the MRT, artworks were seldom included; primarily consisting of a few paintings or sculptures representing the recent past of Singapore, mounted in major stations. The opening of the Woodlands Extension introduced bolder pieces of artwork, such as a 4,000 kg sculpture in Woodlands. With the opening of the North East line in 2003, a series of artworks under a programme called "Art in Transit" were commissioned by the Land Transport Authority (LTA). Created by 19 local artists and integrated into the stations' interior architecture, these works aim to promote the appreciation of public art in high-traffic environments. The artwork for each station is designed to suit the station's identity. Subsequently, all stations on the North East, Circle and Downtown lines have taken part in this programme during their construction, with additional artworks installed at stations on other MRT lines.

Rolling stock and signalling

Rolling stock

This table lists the network's rolling stock.

At present, all lines run with fixed-length trains between three and six cars, with the Thomson–East Coast Line using four cars. Since the system's conception in 1987, all train lines have been powered by the 750 volt DC third rail, with the exception of the North East Line which is powered by 1500 volt DC overhead lines. The North–South and East–West lines use an automatic train operation system similar to London Underground's Central line.

The first 19 of the oldest trains (5 of the C151, 10 of the C651, 4 of the C751B) in the network were phased out between June 2020 and October 2022. Older trains have been renewed over the years under refurbishment schemes to enhance their lifespan as well as to adhere to updated safety and usability codes.
Refurbished and new trains have improved passenger information systems such as the SMRT Active Route Map Information System, more grab poles, wider seats, more space near the doors, spaces for wheelchairs, and CCTV cameras. As a trial run, luggage racks were installed on the C751B trains to serve travellers on the Changi Airport branch line. The scheme was withdrawn in July 2003 and the luggage racks were removed.

All trains are contracted by open tender, with their contract numbers forming the most recognised name of the stock. Official sources occasionally refer to the trains of the North–South and East–West lines as numbered generation trains, with the C151 train being the first and the newest C151C train being the sixth.

In addition to aforementioned passenger electric multiple units, MRT operators also have their own engineering rolling stock used for maintenance purposes. These include Plasser & Theurer tamping machines, multi-function vehicles for rail inspection, Speno railgrinders, cranes, tunnel cleaning wagons, viaduct inspection wagons, CKG diesel locomotives for shunting purposes and Deli diesel locomotives and Schöma electric locomotives for hauling maintenance trains.

Signalling

A key component of the signalling system on the MRT is the automatic train control (ATC) system, which in turn is made up of two sub-systems: the automatic train operation (ATO) and automatic train protection (ATP). The ATC has trackside and trainborne components working together to provide safe train separation by using train detection, localisation, and end of authority protection. It also provides safe train operation and movement by using train speed determination, monitoring, over-speed protection and emergency braking. The safety of alighting and departing passengers will also be provided by using a station interlocking system. The ATO drives the train in automatic mode, providing the traction and braking control demands to the train rolling stock system, adjusts its speed upon approaching the station, and provides the control of opening and closing of train and platform screen doors once the train has stopped at the station. The ATP ensures safe train separation by using the ATP track circuit status and by location determination, monitors the speed of the train to maintain safe braking distance, and initiate emergency braking in the event of overspeed. The MRT also uses an automatic train supervision system to supervise the overall operation of the train service according to a prescribed timetable or train interval.

The oldest lines, the North–South Line and East–West Line, were the only lines running with fixed block signalling. The North–South Line was upgraded to moving block/CBTC in 2017, and the East–West line upgraded in 2018. As of 27 May 2018, all MRT lines use the CBTC/moving block system in normal daily operations and from 2 January 2019, the old signalling system ceased operations. In comparison to the original fixed block system, the CBTC can reduce train intervals from 120 seconds to 100 seconds, allowing for a 20% increase in capacity and is able to support bidirectional train operations on a single track, enabling trains to be diverted onto another track in the event of a fault on one track. The CBTC system also permits for improved braking performance in wet weather as compared to the original fixed-block ATC.

All new MRT lines built since the North East Line in 2003 were equipped with CBTC from the outset, and have the capability to be completely driverless and automated, requiring no on-board staffing. Operations are monitored remotely from the operations control centre of the respective lines. Trains are equipped with intercoms to allow passengers to communicate with staff during emergencies.

Depots

SMRT Corporation has six train depots: Bishan Depot is the central maintenance depot for the North–South Line with train overhaul facilities, while Changi Depot and Ulu Pandan Depot inspect and house trains overnight. The newer Tuas Depot, opened in 2017, provides the East–West Line with its own maintenance facility, while Mandai Depot services trains for the Thomson–East Coast line. The underground Kim Chuan Depot houses trains for the Circle and Downtown lines, now jointly managed by the two MRT operators.

SBS Transit has three depots: Sengkang Depot houses trains for the North East line, the Sengkang LRT line, and the Punggol LRT line. Tai Seng Facility Building, connected to and located east of Kim Chuan Depot, is currently used for the Downtown line. While major operations were shifted to the main Gali Batu Depot in 2015, the Tai Seng Facility Building resumed stabling operations with the extension of the Downtown line in 2017. It currently operates independently from Kim Chuan Depot. Gali Batu Depot is the first MRT depot in Singapore to achieve the certification of Building and Construction Authority (BCA) Green Mark Gold.

In August 2014, plans for the East Coast Integrated Depot, the world's first four-in-one train and bus depot were announced. It will be built at Tanah Merah beside the original Changi Depot site to serve the East–West, Downtown, and Thomson–East Coast lines.

The Tengah Depot for the Jurong Region Line will be situated at the western perimeter of Tengah, and an additional depot facility will be added near Peng Kang Hill station to support the operations of the JRL. Rolling stock for the Jurong Region Line will be stabled at both facilities. Tengah Depot will house the JRL Operations Control Centre and have a bus depot integrated with it to optimise land use.

The Changi East Depot will serve the future Cross Island Line, and the depot is to be placed at the eastern end of the line.

An Integrated Train Testing Centre with several test tracks for different situations and workshops for maintenance and refurbishment is also to be built at Tuas by 2022, with the main function being to test trains and integrated systems robustly before they are deployed on operational lines.

Future expansion

Infrastructure
The following table lists the upcoming lines and stations that have been officially announced:

The MRT system relied on its two main lines, the North–South and East–West lines, for more than a decade until the opening of the North East Line in 2003. While plans for these lines as well as those currently under construction were formulated long before, the Land Transport Authority's publication of a White Paper titled "A World Class Land Transport System" in 1996 galvanised the government's intentions to greatly expand the system. It called for the expansion of the 67 kilometres of track in 1995 to 360 in 2030. It was expected that daily ridership in 2030 would grow to 6.0 million from the 1.4 million passengers at that time.

New lines and extensions are mostly announced as part of the Land Transport Master Plan, which is announced every five years and outlines the government's intentions for the future of the transport network in Singapore. The latest plan, the Land Transport Master Plan 2040, was announced on 25 May 2019, and provides for line extensions to the Downtown and Thomson–East Coast lines, a new MRT line under study, and 2 new stations on the North–South line.

Downtown Line

The , 34 station fully underground Downtown Line connects the north-west and eastern regions of Singapore with a loop travelling through the city center. It commenced operations in three stages, with the initial Bugis to Chinatown segment in 2013, Bukit Panjang to Rochor in 2015 and Fort Canning to Expo in 2017. An extension from Expo is planned to begin operations in 2025, adding an additional 2.2 kilometres and 2 stations to the line, terminating at Sungei Bedok and interchanging with the Thomson–East Coast line. Hume is an infill station between Hillview and Beauty World and expected to open by 2025. Upon Hume's opening, the entire line will be 44 kilometres long and have 37 stations in total.

A proposal has been further mooted to extend the line from Bukit Panjang towards Sungei Kadut which will interchange with the North–South Line. The extension is expected to be completed by the mid-2030s.

Thomson–East Coast Line
The , 32 station fully underground Thomson–East Coast Line is designed to connect the northern region of Singapore to the south, running parallel to the existing North–South line passing through Woodlands, Sin Ming, Upper Thomson, and Marina Bay before turning east and running through Tanjong Rhu, Siglap, Marine Parade, and Bedok. It commenced operations starting with Stage 1 from Woodlands North to Woodlands South on 31 January 2020. The other four stages follow suit, with Stage 2 from Springleaf to Caldecott opened on 28 August 2021, Stage 3 from Mount Pleasant to Gardens by the Bay opened on 13 November 2022 (excluding Mount Pleasant and Marina South, which will open at a later date), Stage 4 from Tanjong Rhu to Bayshore in 2024 and Stage 5 from Bedok South to Sungei Bedok in 2025.

The northern terminus of Woodlands North is expected to interchange with the Johor Bahru–Singapore Rapid Transit System to provide access to Johor Bahru and the future Iskandar Malaysia Bus Rapid Transit. Founders' Memorial station is an infill station along Stage 4, but is scheduled to instead open in tandem with the Founders' Memorial in 2027. In addition, this line and the Canberra MRT Station was the first to use Top-Up Kiosks (TUK) that only allows cashless payments, while GTMs were retained for traditional modes of payment.

Line extension to Changi Airport

In addition to the previously announced alignment of the Thomson–East Coast Line, an extension has been proposed to connect it to Changi Airport, with the line passing through Terminal 5, and eventually absorbing the existing Changi Airport branch on the East–West line. With such an extension, there would be a direct connection between Changi Airport and the city. This extension is expected to start operating by 2040.

Jurong Region Line

First proposed as an LRT line when originally announced in 2001, the  Jurong Region Line has since been upgraded to be a medium capacity line after the project was revived in 2013. The new configuration encompasses West Coast, Tengah and Choa Chu Kang and Jurong.

West Coast extension
Besides the original announced alignment of the line, a West Coast extension to the Circle Line from the Jurong Region Line is currently under study, linking the West Coast region directly to Haw Par Villa, and allowing commuters on the Jurong Region line access to the central area of the city easily. If feasible, the extension would be ready by 2030.

Cross Island Line

The  Cross Island line is expected to span the island of Singapore, passing through Tuas, Jurong, Sin Ming, Ang Mo Kio, Hougang, Punggol, Pasir Ris, and Changi. The new line provides commuters with another alternative for east–west travel to the current East–West line and Downtown line. Connected to all the other major lines, it is designed to serve as a key transfer line, complementing the role currently fulfilled by the orbital Circle line.

Stage 1 of the line was announced in 2019 and consists of 29 kilometres and 12 stations, and is planned to be completed in 2030. In addition, the extension to Punggol announced in 2020 consists of three stations spanning 7.3 kilometers, and is planned to be completed by 2032. Completion of the line is expected to take an even longer timeframe due to the environmental study aspects, targeted to be completed by 2030.

Circle Line Stage 6

The  extension Stage 6 from Marina Bay through Keppel, ending at HarbourFront, effectively completes the circle and links the current ends of the line, allowing for through service through the future Southern Waterfront City without the need to change to other lines. Stage 6 comprises the Keppel, Cantonment, and Prince Edward Road stations. It is forecast to commence operations by 2026.

North East Line extension

Originally scheduled to be completed by 2030, the  extension is being built from Punggol through Punggol North including the new Punggol Downtown to the new tentatively named Punggol Coast station. It was projected to open in 2023, a few years ahead of the expected opening date. Construction of the extension commenced in the first half of 2018. The station has since been delayed to 2024 due to delays from the COVID-19 pandemic.

Brickland and Sungei Kadut MRT stations

Two new stations are planned along the existing North–South Line. Brickland station is expected to be built between Bukit Gombak and Choa Chu Kang stations, while Sungei Kadut station is expected to be built between Yew Tee and Kranji stations. Both MRT stations are expected to be completed by mid-2030s.

Proposed new line along north-east corridor
As part of the Land Transport Master Plan 2040, feasibility studies are ongoing for a possible new MRT line which is proposed to link the north and northeastern regions of Singapore to the south of the island. The new line is proposed to run from Woodlands North via Sembawang, Sengkang, Serangoon North, Whampoa and Kallang to the Greater Southern Waterfront. The official alignment has yet to be confirmed.

Fares and ticketing

Stations are divided into two areas, paid and unpaid, which allow the rail operators to collect fares by restricting entry only through the fare gates, also known as access control gates. These gates, connected to a computer network, can read and update electronic tickets capable of storing data, and can store information such as the initial and destination stations and the duration for each trip. General Ticketing Machines sell standard tickets that can be used up to 6 times within 30 days from the day of purchase. The machines also allow the customer to buy additional value for stored-value smartcards. Such smartcards require a minimum amount of stored credit.

As the fare system has been integrated by TransitLink, commuters need to pay only one fare and pass through two fare gates (once on entry, once on exit) for an entire journey for most interchange stations, even when transferring between lines operated by different companies. Commuters can choose to extend a trip mid-journey, and pay the difference when they exit their destination station.

Fares
Because the rail operators are government-assisted, profit-based corporations, fares on the MRT system are pitched to at least break-even level. The operators collect these fares by selling electronic data-storing tickets, the prices of which are calculated based on the distance between the start and destination stations. These prices increase in fixed stages for standard non-discounted travel. Fares are calculated in increments based on approximate distances between stations, in contrast to the use of fare zones in other subway systems, such as the London Underground.

Although operated by private companies, the system's fare structure is regulated by the Public Transport Council (PTC), to which the operators submit requests for changes in fares. Fares are kept affordable by pegging them approximately to distance-related bus fares, thus encouraging commuters to use the network and reduce heavy reliance on the bus system. Fare increases have caused public concern. Historically, fares on the fully underground North East, Circle, and Downtown lines had been higher than those of the North–South and East–West lines (NSEWL), a disparity that was justified by citing higher costs of operation and maintenance on a completely underground line. However, the Public Transport Council (PTC) announced in 2016 that fares for the three underground lines would be reduced to match those on the NSEWL, which took effect along with the yearly-applied fare changes, on 30 December 2016.

After the opening of Downtown line Stage 3, Transport Minister Khaw Boon Wan announced that public transport fare rules will be reviewed to allow for transfers across MRT lines at different stations due to the increasing density of the rail network. At the time, commuters were charged a second time when they made such transfers. He added that the PTC would review distance-based fare transfer rules to ensure they continue to facilitate "fast, seamless" public transport journeys. The review of distance-based fare rules on MRT lines was completed, and a waiver on the second boarding fee incurred when making such transfers was announced on 22 March 2018. The scheme was implemented on 29 December of the same year.

Ticketing

The ticketing system uses the EZ-Link and NETS FlashPay contactless smart cards based upon the Symphony for e-Payment (SeP) system for public transit built on the Singapore Standard for Contactless ePurse Application (CEPAS) system. This system allows for up to 4 card issuers in the market. The EZ-Link card was introduced on 13 April 2002 as a replacement for the original TransitLink farecard, while its competitor the NETS FlashPay card entered the smartcard market on 9 October 2009.

A card may be purchased at any TransitLink ticket office or passenger service centre for immediate use. The card may be topped up via cashless means at ticketing machines and ATMs or via cash at several stations or convenience stores. Additional credit of a predetermined value may also be automatically credited into the card when the card value runs low via an automatic recharge service provided by Interbank GIRO or credit card. An Adult Monthly Travel Card for unlimited travel on MRT, LRT, and buses may also be purchased and is non-transferable.

In 2017, TransitLink became the first public transport provider in Southeast Asia to accept contactless bank cards and the use of mobile wallets such as Apple Pay, Google Pay and Samsung Pay. The system, named SimplyGo, allows commuters to tap their contactless debit or credit cards, or smartphones/smart watches to pay for fares on the MRT, LRT and Bus network. Support for EZ-Link cards has been added since 2021, while the usage has been low.

A Standard Ticket contactless smart card for single or return journeys, which have been phased out to encourage the use of contactless cards like EZ-LINK or NETS, were made available at the GTM for the payment of MRT and LRT fares. A S$0.10 deposit is levied on top of the fare to be paid. The deposit will be automatically refunded through an offset of the fare to be paid for the third journey on the same ticket while an additional discount of S$0.10 will be given for the sixth journey on the same ticket. No refund of the deposit is provided if the card is used for fewer than 3 journeys. The ticket can be used for the purchase of single or return journeys to and from pre-selected stations up to a maximum of six journeys over 30 days. Fares for the Standard Ticket are always higher than those charged for the stored-valued CEPAS (EZ-Link and NETS FlashPay) cards for the same distance traveled. The ticket is retained by the user after each journey and does not need to be returned. Identical to the usage of CEPAS cards, the ticket is tapped onto the faregate reader upon entry and exit. It is being in the process of discontinuance due to the low usage, and mitigating factors such as top-ups for $2 were possible, as well as the Singapore Tourist Pass, The Singapore Pass and SimplyGo.

For tourists, a Singapore Tourist Pass contactless smartcard may be purchased for use on the public transport network. The card may be bought at selected TransitLink ticket offices and Singapore Visitors Centres.

Performance
The MRT system did not experience any major performance issues during its first quarter-century of operations. However, there were occasional disruptions around the period from 2011 to 2018, the cause of which was often attributed to the system aging coupled with increased ridership due to population growth.

Beginning with the train disruptions in 2011, this incident led to a committee of inquiry which uncovered serious shortcomings in SMRT's maintenance regime. For the December 2011 disruptions, the Land Transport Authority imposed a maximum punishment of S$2 million on SMRT (approximately US$1.526 million) for the two train disruptions along the North–South Line on 15 and 17 December 2011. A Committee of Inquiry discovered shortcomings in the maintenance regime and checks, prompting then-CEO Saw Phaik Hwa to resign.

A much larger power-related incident than the December 2011 event occurred on 7 July 2015, when train services on both the North–South and East–West lines were shut down in both directions following a major power trip. The disruption lasted for more than 3 hours, affecting 413,000 commuters. This was considered the worst disruption to the MRT network since it first began operations in 1987 – surpassing the December 2011 event. Independent experts from Sweden and Japan were hired to conduct investigation into the cause of the disruption. The cause was identified as damage to a third rail insulator due to a water leak at Tanjong Pagar station. Consequently, a program was implemented to replace insulators liable to similar failure. For the July 2015 disruption, LTA imposed a higher penalty of S$5.4 million on SMRT.

On 22 March 2016, a fatal accident occurred off Pasir Ris station. Two of SMRT's track-maintenance trainee staff were lethally run over by an approaching C151 at a signalling box of the station. They were part of a technical team of 15 staff led by a supervisor and were asked to go down to the tracks to investigate an alarm triggered by a possible signalling equipment fault. The operator said the team had permission to access the tracks, but did not coordinate with a signal unit in the station control to ensure train captains in the area where the team was exercised caution while pulling into Pasir Ris station. This incident resulted in a 2.5-hour service delay between Tanah Merah and Pasir Ris Stations, affecting at least 10,000 commuters.

On 7 October 2017, a dilapidated float and pump system at Bishan station caused a tunnel flood after heavy torrential rainstorms. It was the worst train disruption since 2011 and was the first ever flooding incident in the history of the MRT. This resulted in criticism on the public transport operators among Singaporeans once again, and a huge debate about the "high rankings" that manage the system, with calls being made for the resignation of then Transport Minister Khaw Boon Wan. Urban transport expert Park Byung Joon from the Singapore University of Social Sciences added that the negligence displayed by SMRT in this regard was tantamount to a criminal offence, and after an internal investigation, found that the maintenance crew of the Bishan Station's pump system had submitted maintenance records for nearly a year without actually carrying out the works.

Responses
The December 2011 disruptions brought the state of public transportation as a whole to national prominence among Singaporeans, who had previously considered the system to be reliable and robust since its inception in 1987. LTA also noted a marked increase in dissatisfaction with public transport with the release of the 2012 Public Transport Customer Satisfaction Survey, and promised government action to deal with issues relating to system disruptions.

The government reviewed the penalties for train disruptions, and made free travel available for all bus services passing MRT stations affected during any train disruptions. Exits were also made free. In addition, to increase satisfaction with public transport, free off-peak morning travel, later changed to a discount, was introduced with further improvements continuing to be discussed.

Since 2018, efforts in both maintenance and renewal are starting to pay off with the MRT system clocking an average of 690,000 km between delays in 2018 – a 3.8 times improvement than in 2017. The North–South Line, which was hit by the tunnel flood in 2017, in particular saw its train-km between delays increase by ten-fold from 89,000 km between delays in 2017 to 894,000 km in 2018. By July 2019, the Mean Kilometres Between Failure (MKBF) for the North–South and East–West lines had jumped to 700,000 km and 1,400,000 km respectively. The new challenges encountered by the government were now on keeping the funding of such renewals required sustainable in the decades ahead.

Security

Security concerns related to crime and terrorism were not high on the agenda of the system's planners at its inception. After the Madrid train bombings in 2004 and the foiled plot to bomb the Yishun MRT station in 2001, the operators deployed private, unarmed guards to patrol station platforms and conduct checks on the belongings of commuters, especially those carrying bulky items.

Recorded announcements are frequently made to remind passengers to report suspicious activity and not to leave their belongings unattended. Digital closed-circuit cameras (CCTVs) have been upgraded with recording-capability at all stations and trains operated by SMRT Corporation. Trash bins and mail boxes have been removed from station platforms and concourse levels to station entrances, to eliminate the risk of bombs planted in them. Photography without permission was also banned in all MRT stations since the Madrid bombings, but it was not in the official statement in any public transport security reviews.

In 2005, the Singapore Police Force announced plans to step up rail security by establishing a specialised security unit for public transport, then known as the Police MRT unit. The unit today expanded to become Public Transport Security Command (TRANSCOM) since 2009. These armed officers began overt patrols on the MRT and LRT systems on 15 August 2005, conducting random patrols in pairs in and around rail stations and within trains. They are trained and authorised to use their firearms at their discretion, including deadly force if deemed necessary. The unit over time went on to handle other crimes committed on the MRT network, such as theft and molestation. Recently, on its tenth anniversary in 2019, it has formally evolved to become a hybrid, community-based force, and has launched an initiative to get commuters to aid Transcom officers. Since then, 26,000 people have volunteered, far above the 3000 target.

Civil exercises are regularly conducted to maintain preparedness for contingencies. In January 2006, Exercise Northstar V involved over 2,000 personnel from 22 government agencies responding to simulated bombings and chemical attacks at Dhoby Ghaut, Toa Payoh, Raffles Place and Marina Bay stations. In August 2013, Exercise Greyhound tested the response of SBS Transit's Operations Control Centre and the implementation of its contingency plans for bus bridging, free bus service and deployment of goodwill ambassadors (GAs) during a simulated prolonged train service disruption. About 300 personnel including representatives from LTA, SBST, SMRT, the Singapore Police Force's Transport Command (TransCom), Traffic Police and Singapore Civil Defence Force (SCDF) participated in the exercise.

Security concerns were brought up by the public when two incidents of vandalism at train depots occurred within two years. In both incidents, graffiti on the affected trains was discovered after they entered revenue service.
The first incident, on 17 May 2010, involved a breach in the perimeter fence of Changi Depot and resulted in the imprisonment and caning of a Swiss citizen, and an Interpol arrest warrant for his accomplice. SMRT Corporation received a S$50,000 fine by the Land Transport Authority for the first security breach. Measures were put in place by the Public Transport Security Committee to enhance depot security in light of the first incident, but works were yet to be completed by SMRT Corporation when the second incident, on 17 August 2011, occurred at Bishan Depot.

See also

List of Singapore MRT stations
Light Rail Transit (Singapore)
Transport in Singapore
List of metro systems
Medium-capacity rail transport system
Rail transport in Singapore

References

Notes

Citations

Sources

Academic publications

Corporate and governmental sources

External links

 and  

Mass Rapid Transit
Underground rapid transit in Singapore
750 V DC railway electrification
1500 V DC railway electrification
1987 establishments in Singapore
Automated guideway transit